Beloglottis is a genus of the family Orchidaceae. This genus belongs to the tribe Cranichideae and subtribe Spiranthinae.  Orchids of the genus Beloglottis are terrestrial sympodial plants that can be used as herbal supplements.  They have short, solitary stems that stand erect and the fleshy roots contain small hair-like projections and are arranged in a fascicle. Several leaves containing a petiole form at the base of the plant. The flowers appear as if they are upside down.

Species
At present, 6 species are recognized, native to Mexico, Central America, the West Indies, South America and Florida:

Beloglottis boliviensis Schltr. - Bolivia, Argentina 
Beloglottis costaricensis (Rchb.f.) Schltr. - widespread from Florida and San Luis Potosí through Central America, the Caribbean and South America as far south as Bolivia
Beloglottis ecallosa (Ames & C.Schweinf.) Hamer & Garay in F.Hamer - Costa Rica, El Salvador
Beloglottis hameri Garay in F.Hamer - Costa Rica, El Salvador, Honduras, Nicaragua
Beloglottis mexicana Garay & Hamer in F.Hamer - El Salvador, Honduras, Nicaragua, Guatemala, Veracruz, Oaxaca
Beloglottis subpandurata (Ames & C.Schweinf.) Garay - Costa Rica, Honduras, Panama, Guatemala

References

 Dressler, Robert L. The Orchids: Natural History and Classification. Cambridge: Harvard University Press, 1981.
 Ackerman, James.  "Belgottis."  Flora of North America. 26 (1920): 499.

Cranichideae genera
Spiranthinae